Wonderland may refer to:

Places

Municipalities
 Wonderland, California, a ghost town in Plumas County
 Wonderland, Ohio, a ghost town in Columbus, Ohio, U.S.

Roads, streets, and trails
 Wonderland Avenue, a roadway in Laurel Canyon, Los Angeles and the site of the 1981 Wonderland Murders (at 8763 Wonderland Avenue)
 Wonderland Trail, a hiking trail that circumnavigates Mount Rainier in Mount Rainier National Park, Washington, U.S.
 Wonderland Road, a major north–south roadway in the city of London, Ontario, Canada

Other uses
 Wonderland (MBTA station), a rapid transit station on the Blue Line in Revere, Massachusetts, U.S.
 Wonderland Greyhound Park, a former greyhound racing track in Revere, Massachusetts
 Wonderland Village, a shopping center in Livonia, Michigan, U.S.; formerly known as Wonderland Mall and Wonderland Center
 Wonder-land, or Wonderland, sometimes used to refer to Yellowstone National Park

Amusement parks

 Canada's Wonderland, in Vaughan, Ontario, Canada
 Dutch Wonderland, near Lancaster, Pennsylvania
 Wonderland Amusement Park (disambiguation)
 Wonderland Amusement Park (Beijing) (沃德兰游乐园), an unfinished park in China
 Gillians Wonderland Pier, in Ocean City, New Jersey
 Wonderland Amusement Park (Indianapolis), in Indianapolis, Indiana
 Wonderland Amusement Park (Minneapolis), in Minneapolis, Minnesota
 Wonderland Amusement Park (Massachusetts), in Revere, Massachusetts
 Wonderland City, in Sydney, Australia, closed in 1911
 Wonderland Park (Texas), in Amarillo, Texas
 Wonderland Sydney, in Sydney, Australia
 Wonderland Ankara, in Ankara, Turkey

Arts, media and entertainment

Artwork
Wonderland a 1912 painting by Arthur Hughes

Events
Wonderland (event), a club night concept created and developed by UK-based DJ Pete Tong

Film
Wonderland (1931 film), a 1931 short film
The Fruit Machine (1988 film), a 1988 film was known as Wonderland in the US, directed by Philip Saville 
Wonderland (1997 film), a satirical documentary film directed by John O'Hagan
Wonderland (1999 film), a British drama film directed by Michael Winterbottom
Wonderland (soundtrack), an album by Michael Nyman and the soundtrack to the 1999 film
Wonderland (2003 film), a film about the Wonderland Murders (see below), directed by James Cox
Wonderland (2013 film), an Israeli comic thriller film
The Wonderland, or Birthday Wonderland, a 2019 Japanese animated film
Wonderland (upcoming film), a South Korean sci-fi fantasy film

Games
Wonderland (adventure game), a 1990 text-driven adventure by Magnetic Scrolls
Wonderland Online, an MMORPG developed by Chinese Gamer International and published by Internet Gaming Gate (IGG)

Literature
Wonderland (fictional country), the setting in 1865 children's novel Alice's Adventures in Wonderland by Lewis Carroll
Mr Tompkins in Wonderland, a 1940 series of vignettes by George Gamow about modern physics
Wonderland (novel), a 1971 novel by Joyce Carol Oates
Wonderland Avenue: Tales of Glamour and Excess, a 1989 autobiographical book by Danny Sugerman about his life in the music business
Wonderland (novella), a 2003 novel based on the television series

Publications 

 Wonderland (magazine), a British lifestyle and fashion magazine

Music

Artists
Wonderland (band), a girl band
Wonderland, a German band featuring Achim Reichel, Frank Dostal and Les Humphries

Albums
Wonderland (Steve Aoki album)
Wonderland (Benny Carter album)
Wonderland (Erasure album)
Wonderland (Forgive Durden album)
Wonderland (Jessica Jung extended play)
Wonderland (McFly album)
Wonderland (Sarah McLachlan album)
Wonderland (Noosa album)
Wonderland (Nosferatu album)
Wonderland (Sea of Treachery album)
Wonderland (Faryl Smith album)
Wonderland (The Charlatans album)
Wonderland (Take That album)
Wonderland (Stanley Turrentine album)
Wonderland (Judie Tzuke album)
Wonderland (Wonderland album) by the girl band by the same name
Wonderland, a 2007 album by Rubikon
, a 2012 album by Vae

Songs
"Wonderland" (Alcazar song)
"Wonderland" (AleXa song), 2022
"Wonderland" (Big Country song), 1984
"Wonderland" (Heidi Klum song)
"Wonderland" (Kesha song), 2012
"Wonderland" (Natalia Kills song)
"Wonderland" (Taylor Swift song), 2014
"Wonderland" (XTC song)
"Boogie Wonderland", by Earth, Wind & Fire, 1979
"Your Body Is a Wonderland", by John Mayer, 2002
"Wonderland", by Ateez from their albumTreasure EP.Fin: All to Action 
"Wonderland", by Ayumi Hamasaki from her album My Story
"Wonderland", by Band-Maid from their album Conqueror
"Wonderland", by Caravan Palace from their album <|°_°|> 
"Wonderland", by Chvrches from their album Love Is Dead
"Wonderland",  by the Commodores from their album Midnight Magic
"Wonderland", by Eme 15 from their album Eme 15
"Wonderland", by Koshi Inaba from his album Peace of Mind
"Wonderland", by Loudness from their album Sunburst
"Wonderland", by Michael Franks from his album Objects of Desire
"Wonderland", by Passion Fruit
"Wonderland", by Simply Red from their album Stars
"Wonderland", by Tak Matsumoto Group from their album TMG I

Musicals
Wonderland (musical), a 2009 musical by Frank Wildhorn
Wonder.land, a 2015 musical by Damon Albarn
Wonderland, a rave in the off-Broadway musical Bare, a Pop Opera

Television
 Once Upon a Time in Wonderland (TV Series), a 2013 spinoff of the ABC television series Once Upon a Time
Wonderland (Australian TV series), a 2013 Australian television drama series
Wonderland (American TV series), a 2000 American television drama directed by Peter Berg that aired on ABC
Wonderland, an alternate dimension in the Final Fantasy: Unlimited anime, to which the main characters travel
Wonderland, a 2016 live music program on MTV
Wonderland, a 2018 BBC short film in the BBC One 'Oneness' series of station idents
 The Wonderland, a fictional band in the CBBC series Almost Never

Other uses 
Project Wonderland, an open source toolkit for building 3D virtual worlds
Wonderland Club, an international child pornography ring operating over the Internet
Wonderland model, a mathematical model used for studying issues in sustainable development
Wonderland murders, four unsolved killings that occurred at 8763 Wonderland Avenue in Los Angeles on July 1, 1981
Children's Wonderland, meaning either the exhibit or the company

See also 
Winterland (disambiguation)
Wonderworld (disambiguation)